Richard Best may refer to:

Richard Best (film editor) (1916–2004), British film editor
Richard Best (judge) (1869–1939), Irish barrister, Unionist politician, and Lord of Appeal of the Supreme Court of Northern Ireland
Richard Irvine Best (1872–1959), Irish Celticist
Richard Halsey Best (1910–2001), United States Navy officer and World War II dive bomber pilot
Richard Best, Baron Best (born 1945), English social housing leader
Dick Best (born 1954), British rugby union coach and journalist
Richard Best (diplomat) (1933–2014), British Ambassador to Iceland
Richard Best Pencil Company, Inc.